WJOB may refer to:

 WJOB (AM), a radio station (1230 AM) licensed to serve Hammond, Indiana, United States
 WJOB-FM, a radio station (93.3 FM) licensed to serve Susquehanna, Pennsylvania, United States